The Cordillera Central is a volcanic mountain range in central Costa Rica which continues from the Continental Divide to east of Cordillera de Tilarán. It extends 80 km from Tapezco Pass to the Turrialba Volcano and ending on the Pacuare River. It is separated from Cordillera de Tilarán by Balsa River and Platanar and Zarcero hills. The Cordillera Central is part of the American Cordillera, a chain of mountain ranges (cordillera) that consists of an almost continuous sequence of mountain ranges that form the western "backbone" of North America, Central America, South America and Antarctica.

It contains four large volcanoes Poás (2,708 m), Barva (2,906 m), Irazú and Turrialba (3,340 m). The highest peak is Irazú at 3,432 m.

South of the range lie elevated plains of central tectonic depression of Costa Rican Central Valley.

Cordillera Central's four main volcanoes are protected as national parks. Volcanic massif of the Poás Volcano is the central feature of Poás Volcano National Park, featuring permanent fumarolic activity. Barva Volcano features prominent hydrothermal activity (hot springs) and is a part of Braulio Carrillo National Park.

Irazú Volcano National Park contains Irazú Volcano, the highest volcano of Costa Rica. The significant elevation of the volcano makes it a strategic site for telecommunications, many national television and radio stations have their antennas at the summit.

Turrialba Volcano National Park centered on Turrialba Volcano features fumarolic activity and gas emissions.

References 

Central
Central America Volcanic Arc
Talamancan montane forests